Idrettsklubben Våg is a Norwegian sports club from Vågsbygd in Kristiansand.

It has sections for association football, team handball, badminton and athletics. The club was founded on 12 January 1938, and the club colors are green and white.

The women's handball team plays in the highest Norwegian league. The twin sisters and international handballstars Kristine Lunde-Borgersen and Katrine Lunde originally played for "Våg Vipers". The club later changed its name to "Vipers Kristiansand", and is what the club is currently called.

The Norwegian heptathlete Ida Marcussen represents IK Våg, after changing in 2005 after a disagreement with her club Kristiansands IF.

The football section is called Våg FK, and played in the Third Division from 1997 to 2010.

References

External links
 Official site 

Athletics clubs in Norway
Sports clubs established in 1938
Sport in Kristiansand
Norwegian handball clubs
1938 establishments in Norway
Multi-sport clubs in Norway